Lebia chlorocephala is a species of ground beetles in the Harpalinae subfamily.

Distribution
The species is native to most of Europe except extreme North and major part of the South, including European part of Russia, also Western Siberia and parts of Central Asia.

References

External links
Funet.fi

Lebia
Beetles described in 1803
Beetles of Europe
Taxa named by Johann Centurius Hoffmannsegg